Colonel Ivan Vasilyevich Doronin (– 2 February 1951, Moscow) was a Soviet pilot and Hero of the Soviet Union (April 20, 1934).

Biography 
He volunteered for the navy (Baltic Fleet) in 1920 and in 1924 he was assigned to Yegoryevsk Aviation Theorethical School. He graduated from the Sevastopol Flying School in 1925 and then served as a navy pilot in the Black Sea Fleet, later as instructor in naval aviation school. In 1930, Ivan Doronin joined the civil aviation in the Russian North. He was a crew commander at a line Irkutsk-Yakutsk-Bodaybo. He participated in exploration of Kara Sea. Doronin was the first to fly over Verkhoyansk Range, he has mapped a line from Irkutsk to Ust-Srednekan.  

In 1934, he took part in the rescue of the Chelyuskin steamship crew from an improvised airstrip on the frozen surface of the Chukchi Sea, for which he would be awarded the title of the Hero of the Soviet Union. In 1939 he graduated from Zhukovsky Air Force Engineering Academy. Later in his life, Ivan Doronin headed experimental flight stations at Aircraft Factory №1 and Aircraft Factory №301. In 1947, he retired due to his illness.

He died at February 2, 1951. Ivan Doronin is buried in Moscow, at Novodevichy Cemetery.

Ivan Doronin was also awarded the Order of Lenin.

Memory 
 Streets were named after Doronin in Astrakhan, Ekaterinburg, Moscow, Yaroslavl, Sevastopol.
 A post mark was issued in 1935 to commemorate Ivan Doronin.
 A river ship was named after him.

References

1903 births
1951 deaths
People from Saratov Oblast
People from Nikolayevsky Uyezd (Samara Governorate)
Communist Party of the Soviet Union members
Russian aviators
Russian explorers
Soviet Navy personnel
Soviet World War II pilots
Heroes of the Soviet Union
Recipients of the Order of the Red Banner